Emory Andrew Tate Jr. (December 27, 1958 – October 17, 2015) was an American chess International Master, described by grandmaster Maurice Ashley as "absolutely a trailblazer for African-American chess". He is the father of prominent social media influencers Andrew and Tristan Tate.

Early life and education
Emory Andrew Tate Jr. was born in Chicago, Illinois, on December 27, 1958. He grew up in a family of nine children. His father, Emory Andrew Tate Sr., was an attorney, and his mother, Emma Cox Tate, ran a truck-leasing business. Tate Jr. learned to play chess as a child. He served in the United States Air Force as a sergeant, where he "excelled as a linguist." Tate learned Spanish through being an exchange student in Mexico. He was "chosen to participate in the Indiana University Honors Program in Foreign Language, Spanish Division during the summer of 1975" and spent two months living with a Mexican family.

Chess
In 1993, Tate gave chess lessons to elementary school students in Goshen, Indiana, as part of a community school board program.

Tate's highest FIDE rating was 2413 on the October 2006 rating list, which made him the 72nd highest-rated player in the United States and among the top 2000 active players in the world. His peak USCF rating was 2508 on December 30, 1996. He received the international master title in 2007, after earning his third norm at the 2006 World Open.

His older son, Andrew, said: "I never saw him study chess books, ever. He also hated chess computers and never used them. He just sat down and played."

Tate earned a reputation as a creative and dangerous tactician on the U.S. chess circuit, where he won about 80 tournament games against grandmasters. Tate won the United States Armed Forces Chess Championship five times. He won the Indiana state championship six times (1995, 1996, 2000, 2005, 2006, 2007) and was inducted into the Indiana State Chess Hall of Fame in 2005. He also won the Alabama state championship in 2010. Fellow Air Force veteran and 2003 U.S. Armed Forces Chess Champion Leroy Hill said: "All the players had street names. Emory's was ‘Extraterrestrial’ because we thought his play was out of this world."

Personal life
In 1985, Tate married an English woman with whom he had three children, the oldest of whom is the controversial social media influencer and former kickboxer Andrew Tate, born December 1, 1986.

The couple divorced in 1997, and his ex-wife returned to Luton, UK with their children.

Death 
On October 17, 2015, Tate died after suffering a heart attack during a tournament in Milpitas, California. After his death, a number of grandmasters and international masters wrote tributes to him. In 2016, the Alabama Senate passed a resolution "celebrating [his] life and legacy".

References

Bibliography

External links
 
 
 
 
 Biography of Emory Tate, Triple Exclam!!! The Life and Games of Emory Tate, Chess Warrior

1958 births
2015 deaths
Chess International Masters
People from Chicago
African-American chess players
20th-century African-American people
21st-century African-American people
African-American United States Air Force personnel
Northwestern University alumni